Cossulus is a genus of moths in the family Cossidae.

Species
 Cossulus alaicus Yakovlev, 2006
 Cossulus alatauicus Yakovlev, 2006
 Cossulus argentatus Staudinger, 1887
 Cossulus bolshoji (Zukowsky, 1936)
 Cossulus darvazi Sheljuzhko, 1943
 Cossulus griseatellus Yakovlev, 2006
 Cossulus herzi (Alphéraky, 1893)
 Cossulus intractatus (Staudinger, 1887)
 Cossulus irani (Daniel, 1937)
 Cossulus issycus (Gaede, 1933)
 Cossulus kabulense Daniel, 1965
 Cossulus lena Yakovlev, 2008
 Cossulus lignosus (Brandt, 1938)
 Cossulus mollis (Christoph, 1887)
 Cossulus mucosus (Christoph, 1884)
 Cossulus nasreddin Yakovlev, 2006
 Cossulus nedretus de Freina & Yakovlev, 2005
 Cossulus nikiforoviorum Yakovlev, 2006
 Cossulus nycteris (John, 1923)
 Cossulus putridus (Christoph, 1887)
 Cossulus sergechurkini Yakovlev, 2008
 Cossulus sheljuzhkoi (Zukowsky, 1936)
 Cossulus stertzi (Püngeler, 1899)
 Cossulus strioliger Alphéraky, 1893
 Cossulus turcomanica Christoph, 1893
 Cossulus zoroastres (Grum-Grshimailo, 1902)

References

Natural History Museum Lepidoptera generic names catalog

Cossinae
Moth genera